Imre Magyar (born 5 July 1966) is a Hungarian rower. He competed in the men's coxless pair event at the 1992 Summer Olympics.

References

External links
 

1966 births
Living people
Hungarian male rowers
Olympic rowers of Hungary
Rowers at the 1992 Summer Olympics
People from Vác
Sportspeople from Pest County